Bernabé Zapata Miralles was the defending champion but chose not to defend his title.

Arthur Rinderknech won the title after defeating Tomás Barrios Vera 6–3, 7–6(7–2) in the final.

Seeds

Draw

Finals

Top half

Bottom half

References

External links
Main draw
Qualifying draw

Poznań Open - 1
2022 Singles